Lord Palmerston, of the Whigs, first formed a government by popular demand in 1855, after the resignation of the Aberdeen Coalition. Initially, the government was continuation of the previous coalition administration but lost three Peelites (William Ewart Gladstone, Sir James Graham and Sidney Herbert) within a few weeks. However, other Peelites like The Duke of Argyll and The Viscount Canning remained in office. Palmerston was heavily criticised by Parliament in 1857 over the conduct of the Second Opium War and called a dissolution, but the nation voiced its support in the resulting general election and he returned with a Whig majority.

In 1858, the Government resigned when defeated (on a measure for removing conspiracies to murder abroad from the class of misdemeanour to that of felony, which was introduced in consequence of Felice Orsini's attempt on the life of Napoleon III the emperor of the French) and was succeeded by another short-lived Conservative government under Disraeli and Lord Derby.

Cabinet

February 1855 – February 1858

Changes
Later in February 1855 – Sir George Cornewall Lewis succeeds Gladstone as Chancellor of the Exchequer. Lord John Russell succeeds Herbert as Colonial Secretary. Sir Charles Wood succeeds Sir James Graham as First Lord of the Admiralty. R.V. Smith succeeds Wood as President of the Board of Control
July 1855 – Sir William Molesworth succeeds Russell as Colonial Secretary. Molesworth's successor as First Commissioner of Public Works is not in the Cabinet.
November 1855 – Henry Labouchere succeeds Molesworth as Colonial Secretary
December 1855 – The Duke of Argyll succeeds Lord Canning as Postmaster-General. Lord Harrowby succeeds Argyll as Lord Privy Seal. Harrowby's successor as Chancellor of the Duchy of Lancaster is not in the Cabinet
1857 – M.T. Baines, the Chancellor of the Duchy of Lancaster, enters the Cabinet.
February 1858 – Lord Clanricarde succeeds Harrowby as Lord Privy Seal.

List of ministers
Members of the Cabinet are indicated by bold face.

Notes

References
 
Attribution:

British ministries
Government
1850s in the United Kingdom
1855 establishments in the United Kingdom
1858 disestablishments in the United Kingdom
Ministries of Queen Victoria
Cabinets established in 1855
Cabinets disestablished in 1858